Liu is the fourth most common surname in Mainland China. It is shared by nearly 70 million people. This is a list of notable people with the Chinese family name Liu.

Historical Figures
 Liu Bang, Founder of the Han dynasty as Emperor Gaozu of Han
 Liu Jiao (King of Chu), the younger brother of Liu Bang and famous scholar
 Liu Ying, Second Emperor of the Han Dynasty
 Liu Heng, Fifth Emperor of the Han dynasty
 Liu Qi, Sixth Emperor of the Han dynasty
Liu Che, Seventh Emperor of the Han dynasty known for expanding the Han Dynasty to its fullest extent and for a long reign of 54 years
Liu An (King of Huainan), advisor to his nephew, Emperor Wu of Han. Best known for editing the (139 BCE) Huainanzi compendium of Daoist, Confucianist, and Legalist teachings
 Liu Sheng (King of Zhongshan), the direct ancestor of the Shu Han emperors, had more than 120 sons
 Liu Xiang, government official, scholar, and author of who lived during the Han Dynasty
 Liu Fuling, Emperor of the Han Dynasty
Liu He, Emperor of the Han Dynasty
 Liu Xun, Emperor of the Han Dynasty
 Liu Shi, Emperor of the Han Dynasty
 Liu Ao, Emperor of the Han Dynasty
 Liu Xin, Emperor of the Han Dynasty
 Liu Kan, Emperor of the Han Dynasty
 Liu Xin, astronomer, historian, and editor during the Han Dynasty
 Liu Xuan, Emperor Gengshi of the Han Dynasty
 Liu Yan (Xin dynasty), general and older brother of Liu Xiu
 Liu Xiu, The restorer of the Han Dynasty and the founding emperor of the Eastern Han Dynasty
Liu Dai, politician during the Eastern Han Dynasty
Liu Du (warlord), warlord and politician during the Eastern Han Dynasty
Liu Yan (Han dynasty warlord), politician and warlord during the Eastern Han Dynasty
Liu Biao, warlord during the late Eastern Han Dynasty
 Liu Zhuang, Emperor of the Han Dynasty
 Liu Da, Emperor of the Han Dynasty
 Liu Zhao, Emperor of the Han Dynasty
 Liu Hu, Emperor of the Han Dynasty
 Liu Bao, Emperor of the Han Dynasty
 Liu Zhi, Emperor of the Han dynasty
 Liu Hong, Emperor of the Han dynasty
 Liu Xie,  Last emperor of the Han dynasty
 Liu Bei (161–223), Founding emperor of Shu Han
 Liu Shan (207–271), Second emperor of Shu Han
 Liu Hong, astronomer and mathematician of the Han dynasty
 Liu Hui, mathematician during The Three Kingdoms period
Liu Yan (Shu Han), general during the Three Kingdoms Period
Liu Ji (Three Kingdoms), official of Eastern Wu
 Liu Kun, general, poet and musician of the Western Jin
 Liu Yuan, First emperor of Han Zhao
 Liu He, Second emperor of Han Zhao
 Liu cong, Third emperor of Han Zhao
 Liu Can, Fourth emperor of Han Zhao
Liu Yao, Fifth emperor of Han Zhao
Empress Liu E, Empress of Han Zhao
Emperor Wu of Liu Song, First emperor of Liu Song 
Emperor Shao of Liu Song, Second emperor of Liu Song
Emperor Wen of Liu Song, Third emperor of Liu Song
 Empress Liu, Empress of Northern Song
Liu Sanjie, folk music singer during the Southern Song Dynasty
 Liu Zhiyuan, Founding emperor of Later Han
 Liu Chong, Founding emperor of Northern Han
 Liu Yan, Founding emperor of Southern Han
 Liu Rengui, chancellor and general of the Tang Dynasty
Liu Xiangdao, chancellor of the Tang Dynasty
Liu Ji (general), general of the Tang Dynasty
Liu Ji (Tang chancellor), chancellor of the Tang Dynasty
Liu Yan (Tang dynasty), Chinese economist and politician during the Tang dynasty
Liu Zhan, chancellor and official of the Tang Dynasty
Liu Chongwang, chancellor of the Tang Dynasty
Liu Changqing, famous poet and politician
Liu Yuxi, famous poet and statesman
Liu Kezhuang, famous poet of southern song
Liu Xu, chancellor of Later Tang and Later Jin
Liu Bingzhong, chancellor of the Yuan dynasty
Liu Bowen, famous poet, statesman, strategist and thinker
Liu Tongxun, politician of the Qing dynasty
Liu Yong, politician and calligrapher of the Qing dynasty
Liu Mingchuan, First Governor of Taiwan
Liu Ji (politician), (born 1887), 11th Republic-era mayor of Beijing.

Business
Liu Qiangdong, (born 1973), internet entrepreneur and founder of Jd.com
Liu Chuanzhi, (born 1944), Chinese businessman and founder of Lenovo
Yu Liu (entrepreneur), (born 1986), Chinese entrepreneur
Liu Yiqian, (born 1963), autodidact billionaire investor and art collector.
Pete Lau (aka Liu Zuohu; born 1975), Chinese entrepreneur and co-founder of OnePlus
Betty Liu (born 1973), Executive Vice Chairman of the New York Stock Exchange 
K. J. Ray Liu (born 1961), Chinese-American scientist, educator, and entrepreneur

Entertainment

General 
Liu Wen (born 1988), fashion model
Liu Wei (artist), Chinese artist
Liu Yan (dancer), (born 1982), classical Chinese dancer
Sam Liu, American animation producer

Actors and actresses 
Lucy Liu, American actress
Liu Yifei, singer/actress
Liu Shishi, (born 1987), Chinese actress
Jasper Liu, (born 1986), Taiwanese actor, model, and musician
Liu Haoran, Chinese actor
Liu Tao, (born 1978), Chinese actress
Liu Haikuan, (born 1994), Chinese actor
Liu Ruilin, (born 1990), Chinese actor
Hawick Lau, Chinese actor
Liu Tong (actor), (born 1993), Chinese actor and model
 Natasha Liu Bordizzo, Australian Chinese actress
Nina Liu, Australian actress
Liu Yun (actress), (born 1982), Chinese actress
Carina Lau, (born 1965), Hong Kong-Canadian actress and director
 Andy Lau, Hong Kong actor, singer
Liu Ye, (born 1978), Chinese actor
Liu Yan (actress), (born 1980), Chinese actress and singer
 Andrew Lau, Hong Kong filmmaker and actor
Simu Liu, Chinese-Canadian actor
Liu Yijun (actor), (born 1970), Chinese actor
Winnie Lau, (born 1971), Hong Kong singer and actress
Annie Liu, (born 1981), Hong Kong actress
Esther Liu, (born 1988), Taiwanese actress
Lau Kong, (born 1946), Hong Kong actor
Jeffrey Lau, (born 1955), Hong Kong director and actor
Moon Lau, (born 1989), Hong Kong actress
Constance Lau, (born 1991), Singaporean actress and model
Vincent Lau, (born 2001), Hong Kong actor
Liu Xueyi, (born 1990), Chinese actor
Liu Xiaoqing, (born 1955), Chinese actress and businesswoman
Liu Kuan-ting, (born 1988), Taiwanese actor
Leanne Liu, (born 1959) Hong Kong actress
Lau Kar-Leung, (born 1934), Chinese actor and martial artist
Laurence Lau, (born 1954), American actor
Sean Lau, (born 1964), Hong Kong actor
Damian Lau, (born 1949), Hong Kong actor
 Tats Lau, Hong Kong actor and musician
John Liu (actor), (born 1944), Taiwanese actor and martial artist
Tony Liu, (born 1952), Hong Kong actor and martial artist
Serena Liu, (born 1975), Taiwanese dancer and actress
Lau Dan, Chinese actor
Lau Kar-leung, actor, choreographer and director
Dyana Liu, American actress
Patricia Liu, Hong Kong actress
Gordon Liu, Chinese martial arts film actor
Liu Haocun, Chinese actress
Dallas Liu, American actor

Members of Boy Bands
Henry Lau, Chinese-Canadian singer, member of Super Junior-M
 Liu Yangyang (born 2000), Taiwanese singer, member of WayV
Liu Yuning, (born 1990), Chinese singer, member of Modern Brothers
Liu Yaowen, (born 2005), Chinese singer, dancer, and actor, member of Teens In Times (时代少年团)

Members of Girl Groups
 Amber Liu (singer) (born 1992), singer and rapper, member of South Korean girl group f(x) (musical group)
Liu Yuxin (singer), (born 1997), singer and rapper, member of Chinese girl group THE9
Liu Xiening, (born 1996), Chinese singer and dancer and former member of South Korean girl group Gugudan
 Tasha Low (born 1993), Singaporean singer, former leader of South Korean girl group, Skarf

Musical Performers
Lexie Liu, Chinese singer, rapper and songwriter
Will Liu, Taiwanese singer
Liu Wen-cheng, (born 1952),Taiwanese singer and actor
Jun Liu, Malaysian choreographer
Liu Xijun, (born 1988), Chinese pop singer
Liu Liyang, (born 1982), Chinese singer, DJ, producer and actress.
Rene Liu, (born 1970), Taiwanese singer-songwriter, actress, director and writer
Liu Fang, (born 1974), Chinese–Canadian musician and one of the most prominent pipa players in the world.
Liu Chia-chang, (born 1940), Taiwanese songwriter, singer, screenwriter
Liu Yuan (musician), (born 1960), one of the two prominent jazz musicians in China
Liu Liangmo, (born 1909), musician and Chinese Christian leader
Liu Zhuang (musician), (born 1932), musician
Ji Liu (pianist), (born 1990), Chinese concert pianist
 Liu Sola, singer, composer, and writer
 Liu Huan (born 1963), Chinese singer-songwriter
Liu Yang (violinist), winner of China's 5th National Violin Competition
Bruce Liu (pianist), Canadian pianist

Politicians
 Liu Wenhui, warlord and PRC politician
Liu Yunshan, PRC politician
Liu Shaoqi, PRC politician, former Chinese President
 Liu Chao-shiuan, Kuomintang politician
 Liu Chien-sin, Deputy Secretary General to the President of the Republic of China
 Liu Chih-kung, Deputy Secretary-General of National Security Council of the Republic of China (2010–2012)
Liu Pang-yu, Taiwanese politician, Magistrate of Taoyuan County
 Liu Chih-yun, Deputy International Commissioner of the Boy Scouts of China
 Liu Ching-chung, Minister of Hakka Affairs Council (2014–2016)
 Liu Cheng-hung, Magistrate of Miaoli County (2005–2014)
 Liu Cheng-ying, Magistrate of Lienchiang County
 Liu I-chou, Chairperson of Central Election Commission of the Republic of China (2015–2017)
 Liu Kuo-chuan, former Deputy Minister of Veterans Affairs Commission of the Republic of China
 Liu Yuh-san, Secretary-General of the Executive Yuan of the Republic of China (2005–2007)
 Liu Huaqing (1916–2011), PRC politician
 Liu Yu-you, Magistrate of Nantou County (1973–1981)
Laurin Liu (born 1990), Canadian politician
José María Liu, Taiwan representative to Spain
Liu He (politician), (born 1952), Chinese economist and politician
Eric Liu, (born 1968), American writer, former Deputy Assistant for the United States Domestic Policy Council
Liu Fuzhi, PRC politician
Liu Bocheng, PRC military commander
Carol Liu (born 1941), American politician
John Liu, American politician in NYC
Lauren Liu, Canadian politician, the youngest female Member of Parliament in Canadian history
Liu Ning, Chinese politician,  as Communist Party Secretary of Guangxi 2021
Ted Lieu, United States Congressman from California.

Religion

Sports

Basketball
Liu Zhixuan, Chinese basketball player
Liu Chuanxing, Chinese basketball player for Australia's Brisbane Bullets
Liu Xiaoyu (basketball), Chinese basketball player
Liu Wei (basketball), (born 1980) Chinese basketball player

Tennis
Amber Liu (tennis), American former professional tennis player
Liu Nannan, Chinese tennis player
Liu Weijuan, Chinese tennis player
Liu Shuhua, Chinese tennis player
Liu Yanni, Chinese tennis player
Liu Shaozhuo, Chinese tennis player
Liu Fangzhou, (born 1995), Chinese tennis player
Liu Wanting, Chinese tennis player
Liu Siyu, Chinese tennis player
Claire Liu, American tennis player
Liu Chang (tennis), Chinese tennis player

Volleyball
Liu Yanhan, Chinese volleyball player
Liu Dan (volleyball),  volleyball player
Liu Changcheng (volleyball), Chinese volleyball player
Liu Libin, Chinese volleyball player
Liu Lijuan (sitting volleyball), Chinese Paralympic sitting volleyball
Liu Xiaotong, (born 1990), Chinese volleyball player

Figure Skating
Chaochih Liu, (born 1993), Taiwanese-American figure skater
Liu Yan (figure skater), (born 1984), former competitive figure skater
Alysa Liu, figure skater
Anthony Liu, figure skater
Shaolin Sándor Liu, Chinese-Hungarian short track speed skater

Table Tennis
Liu Shiwen, (born 1991), Chinese table tennis player, five-time World Cup champion
Liu Jia, Chinese Austrian table tennis player
Juan Liu, American table tennis player
Na Liu, British table tennis player
Liu Jing (table tennis), (born 1988), Chinese para table tennis player
Liu Guoliang, table tennis player

Swimming
Liu Jing (swimmer), Chinese swimmer
Liu Xiang (swimmer), (born 1996) Chinese competitive swimmer
Liu Daomin, Chinese Paralympic swimmer
Liu Yaxin, Chinese competitive swimmer
Liu Zige, Chinese world record holding swimmer
Liu Ou, Chinese synchronized swimmer
Liu Limin, Chinese butterfly stroke swimmer
Liu Benying, Chinese Paralympic swimmer gold medalist
Liu Yu (para swimmer), Chinese paralympic gold medalist
Liu Xiaohan, Chinese freestyle swimmer
Liu Yuntao, Chinese Paralympic swimmer
Liu Lan, Chinese swimmer
Liu Fengqi, Chinese Paralympic swimmer

Badminton
Liu Kwok Wa (born 1978), Hongkonger badminton player
Liu Xin (badminton), (born 1990), Chinese professional badminton singles player
 Liu Haichao (born 1998), Chinese badminton player

Football
Liu Yue (footballer, born 1997), Chinese footballer
Liu Yue (footballer, born 1975), Chinese footballer
Liu Ji (footballer), (born 1990), Chinese football player

Other Sports
Liu Zhongqing, (born 1985), Chinese Aerial skier
 Liu Xiang, Olympic winner and World Record holder
Isaac Liu, (born 1991), New Zealand Rugby League player
 Liu Yunpeng, Chinese high jumper
Liu Xin (cyclist), (born 1986), Chinese road bicycle racer
Liu Jiayu, Chinese snowboarder
 Liu Jinru (born 2000), Chinese artistic gymnast
 Liu Ping (water polo), (born 1987), Chinese water polo player

Writers
 Cixin Liu (born 1963) Chinese science fiction author
Liu Xiaobo, PRC dissident and Nobel Peace Prize laureate
Liu Dejun, PRC dissident and activist
 Evelyn Lau, writer
 Ken Liu, Chinese-American author
Henry Liu, (born 1932), Taiwanese-American writer and journalist
Liu Yu (political scientist), Chinese author and associate professor of political science at Tsinghua University
Timothy Liu, (born 1965), American poet
Marjorie Liu, American author and comic book writer
Liu Xinwu, (born 1942), Chinese author

Sciences
Huan Liu, Chinese-born computer scientist
Bin Liu, Singapore chemist, Royal Society of Chemistry Centenary Prize winner.
Bing Liu (scientist), Chinese-born American scientist and coronavirus researcher 
Liu Gaolian, Chinese scientist
Charles Liu, Chinese astronomer
Yunhao Liu, (born 1971), Chinese computer scientist
Margaret A. Liu, (born 1956),  physician and researcher 
Jane Liu, Chinese-American computer scientist
Edison Liu, former president of Human Genome Organization
Liu Chen (physicist), (born 1946), is an American theoretical physicist
Yayuan Liu, Chinese-American Materials scientist at MIT
Liu Gang, Chinese scientist and revolutionary
 Christine Liu, American artist and neuroscientist
Chung Laung Liu, Taiwanese computer scientist
Zhiming Liu (computer scientist), Chinese computer scientist
Liu Yunbin, Chinese nuclear chemist
Liu Yan (scientist), Chinese Antarctic researcher
Liu Xin (food scientist), (born 1957)

Miscellaneous
Liu Yang (astronaut), (born 1978), Chinese astronaut, a crew member of Shenzhou 9, becoming the first Chinese woman in space
Finn Lau, (born 1993), Hong Kong political activist
Dan Liu, Hong Kongese fashion designer and founder of TATSUAKI fashion label
J. J. Liu, professional poker player
Gordon J. Lau, (born 1941), Chinese American LGBT activist
 Kei May Lau, Hong Kong engineer
 Liu Hong Mei (1982–2005), Chinese murder victim killed in Singapore
Lau Lee Peng (1952-2000), Singaporean convicted killer and former fishmonger
Wenjian Liu NYPD officer killed by Ismaaiyl Abdullah Brinsley
Susanna Lau, (born 1983), British fashion blogger
Liu Xin (news anchor), (born 1975), host and journalist for CGTN
 Liu Yalou, general
Yan Liu (geographer), Australian geographer
 Tai-Ping Liu (born 1945), Taiwanese mathematician
 Sidney Lau, Hong Kong linguist
 Liu Kwang-ching Historian of China.
Jing Liu (architect), (born 1980), architect and co-founder of SO-IL
Goodwin Liu, American lawyer and Associate Justice
Henry Liu (civil engineer), Former President of EcologicTech.
 Low Hwee Geok, also known as Michelle Low, Singaporean murder victim and former staff member of ITE College Central

Fictional Characters
Liu Tang, fictional character in Water Margin
Liu Kang, fictional character in Mortal Combat

Liu
Liu